Pesochny is a rural locality (a khutor) in Starooskolsky District, Belgorod Oblast, Russia. The population was 11 as of 2010. Pesochny has only one street.

Geography 
Pesochny is located 18 km south of Stary Oskol (the district's administrative centre) by road. Novikovo is the nearest rural locality.

References 

Rural localities in Starooskolsky District